Mahubah (1910–1931) was an American bred Thoroughbred racemare that was noted for producing the outstanding racehorse, Man o' War.

Pedigree
She was a bay mare that was foaled in Kentucky and was owned and bred by August Belmont, Jr. Mahubah was by the imported English Triple Crown winner Rock Sand (GB), and her dam was Merry Token (GB) (minor stakes winner in England) by The Derby winner Merry Hampton. Mahubah was a half-sister to the stakes winner Tactics, by Hastings, and a sister to the stakes winner Sand Mole. 
 
Mahubah had five starts, with a win in a maiden race and one third, for earnings of $390 before she was retired.

Stud record
She was retired to broodmare duty in Lexington, Kentucky and she produced five foals, all by Fair Play. Mahubah's first foal was Masda, a 1915 filly. Masda won six races, was the dam of three stakes winners, and later became the third dam of the American Triple Crown winner Assault. The most notable of Mahubah's offspring was Man o' War, who ranked No.1 in the Blood-Horse magazine List of the Top 100 U.S. Racehorses of the 20th Century. Mahubah also produced My Play who won the 1923 Aqueduct Handicap and the 1924 Jockey Club Gold Cup and later became a good sire.

Mahubah died in 1931 at age 21 and was buried next to Fair Play at Elmendorf Farm.

Owing to the success of her descendants she was listed as a Cluster Mare, which is a Thoroughbred brood mare that has produced two or more winners of five or more of the eight most important and valuable races, within six generations.

See also
 List of historical horses

References

External links
 Mahubah's pedigree

1910 racehorse births
1931 racehorse deaths
Racehorses bred in Kentucky
Racehorses trained in the United States
Belmont family
Thoroughbred family 4-c